Bonavista Archives was established by the Bonavista Historical Society in partnership with the Bonavista, Newfoundland and Labrador and the Bonavista Historic Townscape Foundation. The Archives began as a natural outgrowth of the collection and research done by the Bonavista Historical Society and the Bonavista Museum. The collection began with a few genealogy related items and grew into a substantial collection which now includes church records from thirteen communities in the area. The Archives has since grown to include business ledgers, indentures, photographs, postcards, maps, architectural plans, and audiotapes.

Archival Holdings
The Archives'  textual records date from the 18th to the 20th century.  They include material relating to the history of the town and citizens of Bonavista and the surrounding area.
 Business ledgers
 Indentures
 Photographs
 Postcards
 Maps
 Architectural plans
 Audiotapes
 Genealogy Material - The Archives has extensive material available for people researching their family history. Sources include:Church Records, Cemetery Inscriptions, Census Material, Wills and Land Grants, Family History Files, Directories.

Finding aids are available for most holdings

External links
Bonavista Archives Official Site
 The Garrick Theatre
 Town of Bonavista

Culture of Newfoundland and Labrador
Archives in Canada